The June Junes are a band formed by twins, Max and Sam Woldenberg. They were born in Monterrey, Mexico, on June 23, 1992 in the Hospital San José. They later on moved to San Antonio, Texas where they attended San Antonio Academy. They moved to Los Angeles at age 14 and produced their first EP in 2009.

The June Junes have performed at the Troubadour, opened up for Rooney, and premiered at SXSW Music Festival and Austin Film Festival.

They will soon be releasing some songs in Spanish, but for now are concentrating on English. As Sam said in an interview, "Spanish is actually our first language, so we want to do it," Sam said. "In Spanish, there are so many ways to say love. It's, like, our culture." Also explained in an interview for El Norte, Sam expresses that "Nuestra principal fuente de inspiración son las mujeres... la idea del romántico empedernido, el amor".

At first, they were going by Max & Sam, but soon decided to change their name to the June Junes. There are many reasons for this name change: they were born in June, they are twins that's why the double "June", and also because they call their grandmother June.

Growing up they would listen to songs by Juan Gabriel and Luis Miguel. Some of their other influences go from The Beatles and U2 to Soda Stereo and Mana.

They have two songs featuring on the soundtrack of the 2011 romantic comedy When Harry Tries to Marry. The film's song, "Setting Sun", had its music video filmed at the Gibson Showroom in Austin, Texas.

Discography

References

Rock music groups from Texas
Mexican rock music groups
Mexican twins
American twins